The Permanent Under-Secretary of State for Defence, also called the Permanent Secretary to the Ministry of Defence, is the permanent secretary at the Ministry of Defence. The office holder is the government's principal civilian adviser on Defence matters. The office holder is a member of the Defence Council and the Defence Board. They are the MOD Principal Accounting Officer, and are called to give evidence to the Defence Select Committee.

The position has existed in its current format since the formation of the modern Ministry of Defence in 1964. It was preceded by the Permanent Secretary at the earlier Ministry of Defence (1947–1964), and by the Permanent Secretaries at the government departments that were absorbed into the Ministry of Defence in 1964: the Permanent Secretary to the Admiralty, the Permanent Under-Secretary of State for War, and the Permanent Secretary to the Air Ministry.

The current Permanent Secretary to the MOD is David Williams.

Permanent Secretaries to the Ministry of Defence (1947–1964)
The Permanent Secretaries at the earlier Ministry of Defence (1947–1964):
 1947: Sir Henry Wilson Smith
 1948: Sir Harold Parker
 1956: Sir Richard Powell
 1960: Sir Edward Playfair
 1961: Sir Robert Scott
 1964: Sir Henry Hardman

Permanent Secretaries to the Ministry of Defence (1964–present)
Henry Hardman (1964–1966)
James Dunnett (1966–1974)
Michael Cary (1974–1976)
Frank Cooper (1976–1982)
Clive Whitmore (1982–1988)
Michael Quinlan (1988–1992)
Christopher France (1992–1995)
Richard Mottram (1995–1998)
Kevin Tebbit (1998–2005)
Bill Jeffrey (2005–2010)
Ursula Brennan (2010–2012)
Jon Thompson (2012–2016)
Stephen Lovegrove (2016–2021)
David Williams (2021–)

References

Civil service positions in the United Kingdom
Civil Service (United Kingdom)
 
Permanent Under-Secretaries of State for Defence